KPZA-FM is a radio station airing a Regional Mexican format licensed to Jal, New Mexico, broadcasting on 103.7 MHz FM. The station serves the Hobbs, New Mexico area, and is owned by Noalmark Broadcasting Corporation.

Engineering
Chief Engineer is Kenneth S. Fine, CPBE

References

External links

Mexican-American culture in New Mexico
PZA-FM
Regional Mexican radio stations in the United States
PZA-FM
Noalmark Broadcasting Corporation radio stations